Sockburn is a village and former civil parish to the south of Darlington in County Durham, England. It is situated at the apex of a meander of the River Tees, known locally as the Sockburn Peninsula. 
Today, all that remains of the village is an early nineteenth-century mansion, a ruined church and a farmhouse built in the late eighteenth century.

 

Sockburn is best known for:
 Important links with Lindisfarne and Celtic Christianity
 The discovery of Viking Age  hogbacks.
   The Sockburn Worm  , a ferocious wyvern that laid waste to the village.
 Sockburn Hall, a 19th-century country house and a Grade II listed building.

Governance

Sockburn was once a larger parish.  The ancient parish included the townships of Sockburn in County Durham, and Girsby and Over Dinsdale, both on the opposite bank of the River Tees in the North Riding of Yorkshire. In 1866 Girsby and Over Dinsdale became separate civil parishes. By 1961 the parish had a population of only 32. At the 2011 Census the population of the civil Parish remained less than 100. Details could be found in the parish of Neasham.

Name

Name History 

 Soccabyrig (8th cent.)
 Sochasburgh (8th cent.) 
 Socceburg (12th cent.)
 Socceburn (13th cent.)

Toponym

  Socca's fortification 

  Fortification on tongue of land wedged between two rivers  {{efn
| Scottish Gaelic  ' socach '  :  tongue of land (usually steep, wedged between two rivers ) }} 
Sockburn : (  Socca..byrig  ) (8th cent.) 

The most likely explanation for the unusual Scottish Gaelic name (  Socca..byrig  )
is that it was introduced by  Hiberno-Scottish monks 
when they established a base at Sockburn for Celtic Christianity.

The local language in use at that time was a mix of Old English and Common Brittonic.

It would be expected that words might also be borrowed from Cumbric and Scottish Gaelic
due to geographic proximity and population movements.

The name element  ' Socca '  is from Scottish Gaelic  ' socach '  
(  ” tongue of land (usually steep, wedged between two rivers) ”  ).

"Other mediaeval fragments preserved in the chapel comprise a portion of a square-headed traceried window, a grave-cover with cross formed of four circles conjoined, portions of three other gravecovers, (fn. 131)"

"The chapel also contains the collection of preConquest sculptured stones brought together during the restoration and excavations of 1900. They comprise portions of twenty-two crosses and grave-covers of varied and characteristic design. (fn. 133)''"

Chronology

Chronology of the Early Medieval Period

References

Notes

Citations

Sources

Online

Books

External links

Illustrated article about the Conyers Falchion and the Sockburn Worm legend, with bibliography.  Retrieved 2007-05-29.Information and photos of the project to restore Sockburn Hall.  Retrieved 2007-07-19.
The Blacketts of North East England

Villages in County Durham
Northumbrian folklore
County Durham folklore
Former civil parishes in County Durham